Adam Lee Newton (born 4 December 1980) is a former professional footballer who played for West Ham United, Peterborough United, Brentford and Luton Town. Born in England, he represented the England U21 national team and the Saint Kitts and Nevis senior national team at international level.

Club career

West Ham United
Newton was born in Grays. He began his career in the academy at West Ham United and signed a professional contract in August 1998, but he did not win a call into the first team squad during the 1998–99 season. He had a successful season with the youth team, winning the FA Youth Cup and scoring in both legs of the final. After making his professional debut while on loan to First Division club Portsmouth early in the 1999–00 season, Newton made his West Ham United debut on his return to Upton Park, as a substitute for Marc Keller in a 1–0 Premier League defeat to Coventry City on 25 September 1999. He made two further substitute appearances during the 1999–00 season and understudied right back Trevor Sinclair, but did not appear for the club again and had further spells away on loan during the 2000–01 and 2001–02 seasons. Out of favour with new manager Glenn Roeder, Newton was released by West Ham at the end of the 2001–02 season.

Peterborough United
After rejecting a contract with his previous loan club Leyton Orient, Newton joined Second Division club Peterborough United on a free transfer in May 2002. He quickly established himself in the team and made 249 appearances and scored 9 goals during six seasons at London Road and celebrated promotion to League One with the club at the end of the 2007–08 season. After dropping down the pecking order following the arrival of Russell Martin at the end of the 2007–08 season, Newton's contract was terminated by mutual agreement. He made 249 appearances and scored 9 goals during his .

Brentford
In June 2008, Newton joined League Two club Brentford on a one-year contract, effective 1 July 2008. At the start of the 2008–09 season, Brentford manager Andy Scott named Newton club captain, but he later lost the captaincy to Kevin O'Connor after a spell out injured. Newton was released by Brentford at the end of the season, having helped the Bees win the League Two title. He made 39 appearances and scored one goal during the season, which came in a 3–0 victory over Luton Town on the final day.

Luton Town
On 28 May 2009, Newton signed a two-year contract with newly-relegated Conference Premier club Luton Town. Newton made 67 appearances and scored four goals over the over two seasons with the club and was a team which reached the 2011 Conference Premier play-off Final. On 2 June 2011, it was announced that Newton's contract would not be renewed and that he had been released by the club.

Woking
On 27 June 2011, Newton signed for Conference South club Woking. Despite briefly retiring during the 2015 off-season, he stayed with the club for five seasons and was a part of the team which finished the 2011–12 season as Conference South champions. Newton retired at the end of the 2015–16 season, after making 169 appearances and scoring four goals for the club. In his retirement, Newton occasionally played for Hackney & Leyton Sunday League club Downs.

International career 
Newton was capped once by England at under-21 level, in a 6–1 friendly victory over Georgia in August 2000. In 2004, he was one of three UK-based players to be called up by Saint Kitts and Nevis for the 2006 FIFA World Cup qualifying campaign. He won seven caps and scored one goal for Saint Kitts and Nevis between 2004 and 2015.

Personal life 
After retiring from football, Newton became a London taxi driver.

Career statistics

Honours
West Ham United
FA Youth Cup: 1998–99

Peterborough United
Football League Two second-place promotion: 2007–08

Brentford
 Football League Two: 2008–09

Woking
 Conference South: 2011–12

References

External links

1980 births
Living people
People from Grays, Essex
Sportspeople from Essex
England under-21 international footballers
Saint Kitts and Nevis footballers
Saint Kitts and Nevis international footballers
West Ham United F.C. players
Portsmouth F.C. players
Notts County F.C. players
Leyton Orient F.C. players
Peterborough United F.C. players
Brentford F.C. players
Luton Town F.C. players
Woking F.C. players
Premier League players
English Football League players
National League (English football) players
Black British sportspeople
English sportspeople of Saint Kitts and Nevis descent
Association football defenders